Petišovci ( or) is a settlement south of Lendava in the Prekmurje region of Slovenia. It lies on the left bank of the Mura River, right on the border with Croatia.

The local church in the settlement is dedicated to Saint Rosalia and belongs to the Parish of Lendava. It was built in 1994.

References

External links
Petišovci on Geopedia

Populated places in the Municipality of Lendava